Diego Pinheiro da Silva, commonly known as Diego Pinheiro, or simply as Diego (born June 14, 1980 in Brazil) is a Brazilian professional basketball player. He is a 6'5" (1.95 m) swingman.

Professional career
Pinheiro has played professionally with Winner Limeira of Novo Basquete Brasil.

National team career
Pinheiro is also a member of the Brazilian national basketball team.

Pinheiro made his debut for the senior team at the 2008 South American Championship, averaging 5.8 points and 2.7 assists per game for the team.  He also competed for the gold-medal winning Brazilian team at the FIBA Americas Championship 2009, seeing action in five games off the bench for the Brazilians.

Previously, Pinheiro competed for the junior national team at the 1999 World Championship for Junior Men as a 19-year-old. He was the team's second leading scorer, and helped the Brazilians to an eighth-place finish in the tournament.

References

1980 births
Living people
Brazilian men's basketball players
Esporte Clube Pinheiros basketball players
Novo Basquete Brasil players
Shooting guards
Small forwards
UniCEUB/BRB players
Sociedade Esportiva Palmeiras basketball players